Antal "Tony" Lakatos (born 13 November 1958 in Budapest) is a Hungarian Jazz saxophonist (tenor, soprano saxophone), who currently lives in Frankfurt (Germany).

Lakatos attended the Béla Bartók Conservatory in Budapest from 1975 to 1980, then moved to Germany, where he worked with 's band, Uwe Kropinski, Jasper van 't Hof, and Wolfgang Haffner. He has been leading his own ensembles since the late 1980s, including a group called Things; his sidemen have included JoAnne Brackeen, Terri Lynne Carrington, Al Foster, Billy Hart, and Anthony Jackson. He has also worked with Randy Brecker, Kevin Mahogany, George Mraz, the Mingus Big Band, Chris Hinze, Kirk Lightsey, Dusko Goykovich, Michael Sagmeister, Roberto Magris, Art Farmer, and Kenny Werner.

References

External links 
 Website
 Interview - 2006 (german)

1958 births
Living people
Hungarian jazz saxophonists
European Jazz Ensemble members
Hungarian Romani people
Musicians from Budapest